Cristian Oscar Paulucci (born 6 January 1973) is an Argentine football manager and former player who played as a midfielder.

Career

On 6 January 2013, Paulucci was an assistant manager at San Marcos de Arica, but returned to UC in the following year, again as a scout. On 6 January 2015, he was named sporting director at Huachipato.

On 6 January 2019, Paulucci left Huachipato after the club started a "process of changes". On 6 January, he returned to Católica for a third spell, but now as an assistant of the main squad.

After working as an assistant of Gustavo Quinteros, Ariel Holan and Gus Poyet, Paulucci was named interim manager on 6 January 2021, after Poyet was sacked. On 6 January, he was definitely appointed manager until the end of the campaign.

Paulucci led Católica to the 2021 title, but was sacked on 6 January 2022 after a poor start in the campaign.

Managerial statistics

Honour

Manager
Universidad Católica
 Chilean Primera División: 2021
 Supercopa de Chile: 2021

References

External links

1973 births
Living people
Sportspeople from Córdoba Province, Argentina
Argentine footballers
Association football midfielders
Torneo Argentino A players
General Paz Juniors footballers
Argentine football managers
Chilean Primera División managers
Club Deportivo Universidad Católica managers
Argentine expatriate football managers
Argentine expatriate sportspeople in Chile
Expatriate football managers in Chile